Krazzy 4 is a 2008 Indian Hindi-language comedy thriller film directed by Jaideep Sen and produced by Rakesh Roshan. The film stars Juhi Chawla, Arshad Warsi, Irrfan Khan, Rajpal Yadav and Suresh Menon in lead roles while Shahrukh Khan and Hrithik Roshan appear in item numbers. Music of the film is by Rajesh Roshan. Its the remake of 1989 Hollywood film The Dream Team and a loose adaptation of a 1991 Indian Malayalam-language Mookilla Rajyathu.

Plot
Raja has a temper problem, Gangadhar has an obsession with freedom, Dr. Mukherjee, is a clean freak and Dabboo, has not spoken in years. Dr. Sonali is treating all four of them.

While Raja is diagnosed with Intermittent Explosive Disorder due to his sudden anger at the slightest provocation, schizophrenic Gangadhar is living in the past where he shares friendships with Jawaharlal Nehru, Mahatma Gandhi, Lokamanya Tilak and Sardar Vallabhbhai Patel. He seems busy fighting for the country's freedom, which was achieved long back. Dr. Mukherjee is a perfect doctor and always keeps himself tidy and prim. He has been diagnosed with Obsessive Compulsive Personality Disorder. Dabboo suffers from Selective Mutism. He has not spoken for years and appears frightened all the time. He is loved by one and all.

Dr. Sonali negotiates with the mental hospital's top doctors to allow her to take the four of them for a cricket match between India and England which is being held on Independence Day. She eventually manages to get permission and the four of them get ready. The following morning, she takes them to the match and on the way stops at her clinic to pick up some important papers. She tells the group to stay in the car.

After a while, Dabboo gets out of the car and goes to a spot nearby to urinate. From there, he watches Dr. Sonali being kidnapped by thugs. He notices one of the faces as a thug removes his mask. Dabboo then goes back to the car where his friends realize that something is wrong from the expression on his face, but soon ignore it as Dabboo cannot speak.

As time goes on, the four become bored. One by one, all of them except Dabboo get out of the car to look for Dr. Sonali.  They split up and go to different places.  Meanwhile, Dr. Sonali is being bribed to sign papers for declaring a criminal called Rana insane at a hospital at 11 am the following day. As Raja searches for her, he passes by a store where there is a TV set showing a news report about Independence Day. Raja notices that the woman who is speaking is actually his ex-girlfriend, Shikha, who he had lost a long time ago. He tracks her, and the two have a tearful reunion.

Raja decides to go to Shikha's house to apologize to her father, as he had been rude to him the last time they had met. He, however, meets Shikha's new boyfriend Pranav to who she will be engaged and married very soon. Raja becomes angry and starts beating Pranav up, and is once again thrown out of the house. Meanwhile, Gangadhar returns after having followed some school children singing Sare Jahan Se Accha and accidentally bumps into Dr. Mukherjee. They realize that the car is gone. Raja then returns and goes with the group to a nearby traffic station, where they find Dabboo and register a complaint that Dr. Sonali is missing.

Raja then comes up with the idea that they should call up Sonali's husband, R K Sanyal, and tell him what has happened. They get his number from the traffic station and find out that he is at a hotel. They find him there but he receives a call from a man who tells him that Sonali has been captured and is safe which leads the team to realize that he was behind the kidnapping. They are caught by the same man who Dabboo saw kidnapping Sonali. They manage to escape and head off to Shikha's office, begging her to help them. She reluctantly agrees, and they kidnap Sanyal at the Star Awards function. They make him announce that he will pay Rs 50 million to anyone who finds Sonali.  Sanyal then escapes but this is just part of the plan as they have hidden a camera that films what he does and says.

Then, they go to Pranav's office and beg him to play the video as he works with Shikha, but he doesn't agree. They, however, play the tape and a very distressed husband and his partner watch it. The next day, a taxi driver picks up four people who have found Dr. Sonali and he immediately recognizes who she is and takes the four men to a village close by where they are captured and put into the earth like seeds. He then calls them and tells the four about the news. When they arrive at the scene, they find her missing again. They eventually find her wrapped in a bag and walk away only to be caught by the board of directors but escape after Sonali again when she suddenly disappears.

She gets into the car which her husband's partner is driving and goes to the hospital. The four follow her in auto and arrive at the hospital moments later after Sonali was dropped off there. Dr. Mukherjee runs somewhere in the building leaving the others lost. When Sonali goes to the room where Rana is being held, the other three turn out to be the doctors who are also meant to examine Rana shortly joined by Dr. Mukherjee who ran off to see his wife who worked in the same hospital. They then torture him by injecting him with needles, electrocuting him, and giving him a heart shock.  They then explain to Sonali that her husband was the one that kidnapped her and that it was just a trick to get her to do what they wanted.  They then catch the criminals responsible and the movie ends when all of them go back home.

Cast

Guest Appearances
Shahrukh Khan in song "Break Free"
Hrithik Roshan in song "Krazzy 4 title song"
Rakhi Sawant In item number "Dekhta hai Tu Kya"
Sunil Pal

Production
Krazzy 4 marks the first production-only venture by Rakesh Roshan. In all his previous films, he not only produced but also directed them. Sunaina, Roshan's daughter, who recovered from cervical cancer, served as a co-producer on the film.

It also marks Irrfan Khan and Juhi Chawla acting in the same film after a period of four years. The last they were seen in a film was in 7½ Phere (2005). Chawla reprises her role of a psychiatrist after a gap of 10 years, when she did Deewana Mastana (1997).

The film features an item number by Shahrukh Khan and Hrithik Roshan, Rakesh's son. While Hrithik will introduce the protagonists via a promotional video, Shahrukh will be shown performing at a function, as a part of an important sequence in the film. About Shahrukh's gesture by performing the item number, Hrithik said "it's the first time something like this has been done, it highlights the solidarity of the industry. Shah Rukh has shown a lot of grace and respect for my father and we're touched as a family." While this marks the second item number for Hrithik after Dhoom 2 (2006), it will be Shahrukh's third after Kaal (2005) and Om Shanti Om (2007). Rakhi Sawant also lent her bit by performing another item number in the film.

Ashwani Dhir, who wrote for Office Office, a sitcom on Indian television, wrote the dialogues and screenplay for the film. Rajesh Roshan, Rakesh's brother has composed the music, while Javed Akhtar has penned the lyrics for the movie.
In an interview, Rakesh said that their intention was the finish the shooting by December 2007. About why Hrithik was not a part of this film, he chose not to reveal the reasons. Dia Mirza said about her experience working in the film:

 I'm part of Rakesh Roshan's Krazzy 4 though I'm one of the sane members of the cast. That's sad because I'd have happily played one of the nuts. It's been good fun because I got to work with artists I've always admired like Irrfan Khan, Arshad Warsi and Juhi Chawla. I adore Juhi, to be working with her is like a dream come true.

The trailers for the film were out on 25 January 2008.

Music

The music of the film is composed by Rajesh Roshan.

Music composer Ram Sampath alleged that the music of two of the songs of this movie ("Break Free" and "Krazzy 4") are copied from a Sony Ericsson advertisement, composed by him. He lodged a case against the producers of the film claiming damages of  20  million. On 10 April 2008, the Bombay High Court upheld his complaint and directed producer Rakesh Roshan to delete the songs from the film. The producers reached an out-of-court settlement with Sampath, and the movie was released with the controversial songs on 11 April 2008.

References

External links
 
 

2000s Hindi-language films
2008 films
Indian comedy thriller films
Films scored by Rajesh Roshan
Films about psychiatry
Films distributed by Yash Raj Films
2008 comedy films